Tripwire Interactive LLC is an American video game developer and publisher based in Roswell, Georgia.

History
Tripwire was co-founded by John Gibson and Alan Wilson with support by members of the international team that created Unreal Tournament 2004 mod Red Orchestra: Combined Arms.  Red Orchestra won top prize in the Nvidia-sponsored Make Something Unreal competition. Their first retail product, Red Orchestra: Ostfront 41-45, was released over Valve's Steam service on March 14, 2006.

Tripwire's second game, Killing Floor, was released on May 14, 2009. Like Red Orchestra, this game also began development as a Unreal Tournament 2004 mod, later becoming a standalone retail title. Tripwire released and published their third game on September 13, 2011 titled Red Orchestra 2: Heroes of Stalingrad, which is the sequel to their debut World War II-themed Red Orchestra: Ostfront 41-45 first-person shooter. The title focuses heavily on the Battle of Stalingrad.  and uses Unreal Engine 3. On May 30, 2013, the expansion pack Rising Storm was released, focusing on the Pacific War with real life battle locations such as the Battle of Iwo Jima. 

After 2014, both Rising Storm and Red Orchestra 2 were integrated into a singular release titled Red Orchestra 2: Heroes of Stalingrad with Rising Storm.

Tripwire Interactive announced their fifth game, Killing Floor 2 in May 2014 and released it into early access in early 2015. In 2015, Tripwire announced Rising Storm 2: Vietnam at E3 2015 and proceeded to release it in 2017. 

In August 2022, it was announced that Tripwire was being purchased by Embracer Group, the parent company of THQ Nordic. The company would be made a subsidiary of Saber Interactive.

Controversy 
On September 4, 2021, Tripwire CEO and co-founder John Gibson stated on Twitter that he supports the Texas Heartbeat Act. The Act bans abortion after an embryo’s heartbeat is detected, except to save the mother's life. In response, Gibson faced criticism from people involved in the video games industry, including Torn Banner Studios, which had used Tripwire for publishing of Chivalry 2, and Shipwright Studios, which had been working with Tripwire for three years but stated their intent to terminate these contracts due to the comments. By September 6, 2021, Gibson announced he was stepping down as CEO of Tripwire, and the company issued its own announcement that "the comments given by John Gibson are of his own opinion, and do not reflect those of Tripwire Interactive as a company". Tripwire announced that co-founder and vice president Alan Wilson would assume Gibson's duties, and the company would immediately address employee concerns related to Gibson's statement and promote open communication to transition to the new leadership.

Games developed

Games published
 The Ball
 Dwarfs!?
 Killing Floor: Calamity
 Rising Storm 2: Vietnam 
 Maneater
 Zeno Clash
 Espire 1: VR Operative
 Road Redemption
 Chivalry 2

References

External links
Tripwire Interactive

2005 establishments in Georgia (U.S. state)
2022 mergers and acquisitions
American companies established in 2005
Companies based in Roswell, Georgia
Video game companies established in 2005
Video game companies of the United States
Video game development companies
Video game publishers
Saber Interactive